Anthony Coulls is a British museum curator and historian. He is the Senior Curator of Rail Transport and Technology at the National Railway Museum, the author of several books on railway and industrial history, and is active in the steam heritage movement.

History 
A graduate of firstly Aberystwyth University and then the Ironbridge Institute, Coulls began his museum career as a Collections Assistant at the National Railway Museum in 1997, moving to Leicestershire Museums in January 1999. Between 2001 and 2004, Coulls was the Curator of Energy at the Museum of Science and Industry in Manchester, moving in 2004 to become Collections Care Manager at Locomotion, The National Railway Museum at Shildon. In 2009 he was appointed the Senior Curator of Railway Vehicles at the National Railway Museum, and is now the Senior Curator of Rail Transport and Technology there, where he oversees the curation policy for the national collection of railway locomotives. He is an active railway preservationist, as Chairman of the Friends of Thorpe Light Railway, an advisor to the Sierra Leone National Railway Museum, and a mentor - and former trustee - of the Narrow Gauge Railway Museum Trust. He is an expert on the Lowca Engineering Works of Tulk and Ley and Fletcher, Jennings & Co.

In 2003, Coulls took on loan a 15-ton road roller, built in 1894 by Aveling and Porter, from Beamish Museum, which he subsequently restored to working order. He is a past general secretary of the Road Rollers Association and from 2015 to 2019 was Chairman of the National Traction Engine Trust. In 2019, Coulls was the Lead Curator for the Award-Winning exhibition of model steam locomotives at the National Railway Museum "Brass, Steel and Fire" which then moved on to the Science Museum, London in 2020, running to August 2021.

Works

References 

English male non-fiction writers
Rail transport writers
Railway historians
20th-century English historians
Living people
Year of birth missing (living people)
English curators
British people associated with Heritage Railways